The Royal Birmingham Society of Artists or RBSA is an art society, based in the Jewellery Quarter in Birmingham, England, where it owns and operates an art gallery, the RBSA Gallery, on Brook Street, just off St Paul's Square. It is both a registered charity, and a registered company (no. 122616).

History 

The RBSA was established as the Birmingham Society of Artists in 1821, though it can trace its origins back further to the life drawing academy opened by Samuel Lines, Moses Haughton, Vincent Barber and Charles Barber in Peck Lane (now the site of New Street Station) in 1809. From this group was founded the Birmingham Academy of Arts in 1814, whose first exhibition was held that year. A gallery and set of offices for the Birmingham Society of Arts was built behind a fine neo-classical portico in New Street by architect Thomas Rickman in 1829. In 1868 the RBSA received its royal charter and adopted its current name.

The RBSA was to become a highly influential body in the later Victorian period, particularly within the Pre-Raphaelite and Arts and Crafts movements. Its members included some of the most significant figures in English art, and presidents during the period included artists of the stature of Edward Burne-Jones, William Morris, John Everett Millais and Lord Leighton. Members of the Royal Birmingham Society of Artists are entitled to use the post-nominal letters RBSA.

One of principal aims of the Society from its foundation had been to continue the educational activities pioneered by Lines. Initially this work was carried out by the society itself, but in 1843 the Birmingham School of Art was founded as a separate institution, falling under municipal control from 1877.

Increasing financial pressure in the early years of the 20th century led to the society's landmark New Street building being demolished and rebuilt as part of a commercial redevelopment, and in 2000 the society left the site completely, relocating to a converted warehouse near St Paul's Square in the Jewellery Quarter. This is now known as the RBSA Gallery, and was opened by Charles, Prince of Wales, on 12 April 2000.

The two bronze plaques on its exterior, made in 1919, are the earliest known Birmingham works of William Bloye, later the society's president and Professor of Sculpture.

In 2014, the gallery celebrated its bicentenary since its first exhibition. This was marked by an exhibition from the 8 October -15 November, called A Place For Art, exploring the gallery's 200-year history of displaying works of contemporary art.

Presidents 

Many of the Society's presidents were notable artists. They include:

Current activities 

The RBSA continues its core activities today as an independent society promoting artists in the Birmingham area and exhibiting their work. It also runs a series of demonstrations, as well as adult and family friendly workshops and school programmes. The Society also has a permanent collection of over 600 works, including pieces by illustrious figures from its past such as David Cox and Edward Burne-Jones.

Artists can apply to become 'Associates', subject to majority vote by existing members. Active associates may then apply to become 'members', again subject to a majority vote.

See also 

 :Category:Members and Associates of the Royal Birmingham Society of Artists

References

The Making of Birmingham: Being a History of the Rise and Growth of the Midland Metropolis, Robert K. Dent, Published by J. L. Allday, 1894 
Buildings of England: Warwickshire, Nikolaus Pevsner and Alexandra Wedgwood, 1966, 1974,

External links 
Royal Birmingham Society of Artists
History of RBSA
 

British artist groups and collectives
19th-century art groups
1821 establishments in England
Art museums and galleries in Birmingham, West Midlands
Tourist attractions in Birmingham, West Midlands
Birmingham
1821 in art
Charities based in Birmingham, West Midlands
Art societies
Clubs and societies in the West Midlands (county)